Madre de Deus de Minas is a Brazilian municipality located in the state of Minas Gerais. The city belongs to the mesoregion of Campo das Vertentes and to the microregion of Sao Joao del Rei. In 2020, the estimated population was 5,109.

Geography 
According to IBGE (2017), the municipality belongs to the Immediate Geographic Region of São João del-Rei, in the Intermediate Geographic Region of Barbacena.

Ecclesiastical circumscription 
The municipality is part of the Roman Catholic Diocese of São João del-Rei.

See also
 List of municipalities in Minas Gerais

References

Municipalities in Minas Gerais